Vehicle infrastructure integration (VII) is an initiative fostering research and applications development for a series of technologies directly linking road vehicles to their physical surroundings, first and foremost in order to improve road safety. The technology draws on several disciplines, including transport engineering, electrical engineering, automotive engineering, and computer science. VII specifically covers road transport although similar technologies are in place or under development for other modes of transport. Planes, for example, use ground-based beacons for automated guidance, allowing the autopilot to fly the plane without human intervention. In highway engineering, improving the safety of a roadway can enhance overall efficiency. VII targets improvements in both safety and efficiency.

Vehicle infrastructure integration is a branch of engineering that deals with the study and application of directly linking road vehicles to their physical surroundings in order to improve road safety.

Goals 
The goal of VII is to provide a communications link between vehicles on the road (via On-Board Equipment, OBE), and between vehicles, and the roadside infrastructure (via Roadside Equipment, RSE), in order to increase the safety, efficiency, and convenience of the transportation system.  It is based on widespread deployment of a dedicated short-range communications (DSRC) link, incorporating IEEE 802.11p. VII's development relies on a business model supporting the interests of all parties concerned: industry, transportation authorities, and professional organizations.  The initiative has three priorities:
 evaluation of the business model (including deployment scheduling) and acceptance by the stakeholders;
 validation of the technology (in particular the communications systems) in the light of deployment costs; and
 development of legal structures and policies (particularly in regard to privacy) to enhance the system's potential for success over the longer term.

Safety
Current active safety technology relies on vehicle-based radar and vision systems. For example, this technology can reduce rear-end collisions by tracking obstructions in front or behind the vehicle, automatically applying brakes when needed. This technology is somewhat limited in that it senses only the distance and speed of vehicles within the direct line of sight of cameras and the sensing range of radars. It is almost completely ineffective for angled and left-turn collisions . It may even cause a motorist to loose control of the vehicle in the event of an impending head-on collision.  The rear-end collisions covered by today's technology are typically less severe than angle, left-turn, or head-on collisions. Existing technology is therefore inadequate for the overall needs of the roadway system.

VII would provide a direct link between a vehicle on the road and all vehicles within a defined vicinity.  The vehicles would be able to communicate with each other, exchanging data on speed, orientation, perhaps even on driver awareness and intent. This could increase safety for nearby vehicles, while enhancing the overall sensitivity of the VII system, for example, by performing an automated emergency maneuver (steering, decelerating, braking) more effectively. In addition, the system is designed to communicate with the roadway infrastructure, allowing for complete, real-time traffic information for the entire network, as well as better queue management and feedback to vehicles. It would ultimately close the feedback loops on what is now an open-loop transportation system.

Through VII, roadway markings and road signs could become obsolete.  Existing VII applications use sensors within vehicles that can identify markings on the roadway or signing along the side of the road, automatically adjusting vehicle parameters as necessary.  Ultimately, VII aims to treat such signs and markings as little more than stored data within the system. This could be in the form of data acquired via beacons along a roadway or stored at a centralised database and distributed to all VII-equipped vehicles.

Efficiency

All the above factors are largely in response to safety but VII could lead to noticeable gains in the operational efficiency of a transportation network. As vehicles will be linked together with a resulting decrease in reaction times, the headway between vehicles could be reduced so that there is less empty space on the road. Available capacity for traffic would therefore be increased. More capacity per lane will in turn mean fewer lanes in general, possibly satisfying the community's concerns about the impact of roadway widening. VII will enable precise traffic-signal coordination by tracking vehicle platoons and will benefit from accurate timing by drawing on real-time traffic data covering volume, density and turning movements.

Real-time traffic data can also be used in the design of new roadways or modification of existing systems as the data could be used to provide accurate origin-destination studies and turning-movement counts for uses in transportation forecasting and traffic operations. Such technology would also lead to improvements for transport engineers to address problems whilst reducing the cost of obtaining and compiling data. Tolling is another prospect for VII technology as it could enable roadways to be automatically tolled. Data could be collectively transmitted to road users for in-vehicle display, outlining the lowest cost, shortest distance, and/or fastest route to a destination on the basis of real-time conditions.

Existing applications

To some extent, results along these lines have been achieved in trials performed around the globe, making use of GPS, mobile phone signals, and vehicle registration plates.  GPS is becoming standard in many new high-end vehicles and is an option on most new low- and mid-range vehicles. In addition, many users also have mobile phones which transmit trackable signals (and may also be GPS-enabled).  Mobile phones can already be traced for purposes of emergency response.  GPS and mobile phone tracking, however, do not provide fully reliable data. Furthermore, integrating mobile phones in vehicles may be prohibitively difficult. Data from mobile phones, though useful, might even increase risks to motorists as they tend to look at their phones rather than concentrate on their driving. Automatic registration plate recognition can provide high levels of data, but continuously tracking a vehicle through a corridor is a difficult task with existing technology. Today's equipment is designed for data acquisition and functions such as enforcement and tolling, not for returning data to vehicles or motorists for response. GPS will nevertheless be one of the key components in VII systems.

Limitations

There are numerous limitations to the development of VII. A common misconception is that the biggest challenge to VII technology is the computing power that can be fitted inside a vehicle.  While this is indeed a challenge, the technology for computers has been advancing rapidly and is not a particular concern for VII researchers.  Given the fact that technologies already exist for the most basic of forms of VII, perhaps the greatest hurdle to the deployment of VII technology is public acceptance.

Privacy

The most common myth about VII is that it includes tracking technology; however, this is not the case. The architecture is designed to prevent identification of individual vehicles, with all data exchange between the vehicle and the system occurring anonymously.  Exchanges between the vehicles and third parties such as OEMs and toll collectors will occur, but the network traffic will be sent via encrypted tunnels and will therefore not be decipherable by the VII system.

Although the system will be able to detect signal and speed violations, it will not have the capability to identify the violator and report them.  The detection is for the purpose of alerting the violator and/or approaching vehicles, to prevent collisions.

Other public concerns

Other public acceptance concerns come from advocates of recreational driving as well as from critics of tolling.  The former argue that VII will increase the automation of the vehicle, reducing the driver's enjoyment. Recreational driving concerns are particularly prevalent among owners of sports cars. They could be attenuated by compensating for the presence of vehicles without VII or perhaps by maintaining roadways where vehicles without VII are permitted to travel.

Those opposed to tolling believe it will make driving prohibitively expensive for motorists in the lower-income bracket, conflicting with the general wish to provide equal services for all. In response, public transit discounts or road use discounts can be considered for qualifying individuals and/or families. Such provisions currently exist for numerous tolled roadways and could be applicable to roadways that are tolled via VII.  However, as VII could allow for the tolling of every VII-enabled roadway, the provisions may be ineffective in view of the increased need to provide user-efficient transit services to every area.

Technical issues

Coordination

A major issue facing the deployment of VII is the problem of how to stand up the system initially.  The costs associated with installing the technology in vehicles and providing communications and power at every intersection are significant.  Building out the infrastructure along the roadside without the auto manufacturers' cooperation would be disastrous, as would the reverse situation; therefore, the two parties will need to work together to make the VII concept work.

There are proof of concept tests being performed in Michigan and California that will be evaluated by the US DOT and the auto manufacturers, and a decision will be made, jointly, about whether or not to move forward with implementation of the system at that time.

Maintenance

Another factor for consideration in regard to the technology's distribution is how to update and maintain the units. Traffic systems are highly dynamic, with new traffic controls implemented every day and roadways constructed or repaired every year.  The vehicle-based option could be updated via the internet (preferably wireless), but may subsequently require all users to have access to internet technology.  Many local government agencies have been testing deployment of internet facilities in cities and along roadways, for example at rest-stops. These systems could be used for VII updating.

An additional option is to provide updates whenever a vehicle is brought in for inspection or servicing.  A major limitation here is that updating would be in the hands of the user.  Some vehicle owners maintain their vehicles themselves, and periodic inspections or servicing are considered too infrequent for updating VII.  Motorists might also be reluctant to stop at rest-stops for an update if they do not have the possibility of driving in an internet-enabled city.

Alternatively, if receivers were placed in all vehicles and the VII system was primarily located along the roadside, information could be stored in a centralised database. This would allow the agency responsible to issue updates at any time. These would then be disseminated to the roadside units for passing motorists. Operationally, this method is currently considered to provide the greatest effectiveness but at a high cost to the authorities.

Security

Security of the units is another concern, especially in the light of the public acceptance issue. Criminals could tamper with VII units, or remove and/or destroy them regardless of whether they are installed inside vehicles or along the roadside.  If they are placed inside vehicles, laws similar to those for tampering with an odometer could be enacted; and the units could be examined during inspections or services for signs of tampering.  This method has many of the limitations mentioned in relation to the frequency of inspection and motorists who perform their own servicing. It also raises concerns regarding the honesty of vehicle technicians performing the inspections. The ability of technicians to identify signs of tampering would be dependent on their knowledge of the VII systems themselves.

Magnets, electric shocks, and malicious software (viruses, hacking, or jamming) could be used to damage VII systems – regardless of whether units are located inside vehicle or along the roadside.  Extensive training and certification would be required for technicians to inspect VII units within a vehicle.  Along the roadside, a high degree of security would be required to ensure that the equipment is not damaged and to increase its durability. However, as roadside units could well be placed on the public right-of-way – which is often close to the edge of the roadway – there could be concerns about vehicles hitting them (whether on purpose or by accident). The units would either have to be built so that they do not provide a threat to motorists: perhaps in the form of a low-profile and/or low-mass object designed to be run over or to break apart (which would entail a relatively inexpensive unit); or the unit would have to be shielded by a device such as a guardrail, raising safety concerns of its own.

Data input

Yet another limitation is in digitizing the inputs for the VII system. VII systems will probably continue to sense existing signs and roadway markings but one of the goals is to eliminate such signs and markings altogether. This would require converting the locations and messages of each item into the VII system's format. Responsibility for this work would probably fall on the highway agencies which nearly all face difficulties in funding, manpower, and available time. Implementing and maintaining VII systems may therefore require support at the national level.

Communications and authorization

While VII is largely being developed as a joint research enterprise involving numerous transport agencies, it is likely initial products will be tailored to individual applications. As a result, compatibility and formatting issues could well arise as systems expand. Overcoming these difficulties could require complicated translation programs between different systems or possibly a complete overhaul of existing VII systems in order to develop a more comprehensive approach.  In either case, the costs and potential for bugs in the software will likely be high.

Legislation will be required to set in place access to the VII data and communications between applicable agencies.  In the USA, for example, an Interstate is a Federal roadway that is often maintained by the State, but the local county or municipal authorities may be involved too.  The legislation would need to set the levels of authority of each agency.  In Pennsylvania, for example, municipalities tend to have greater authority than counties and sometimes even the State whereas neighboring Maryland has more authority at the county level than at municipal level; and State roads are almost exclusively controlled by the State.  It would also have to be determined which other agencies can use the data (i.e. law enforcement, Census, etc.) and to what degree it is permissible to use the information. Law enforcement would be needed to minimise data misuse.  The various levels of authority could also increase incompatibility.

Recent developments
Much of the current research and experimentation is conducted in the United States where coordination is ensured through the Vehicle Infrastructure Integration Consortium, consisting of automobile manufacturers (Ford, General Motors, Daimler Chrysler, Toyota, Nissan, Honda, Volkswagen, BMW), IT suppliers, U.S. Federal and state transportation departments, and professional associations. Trialling is taking place in Michigan and California.

The specific applications now being developed under the U.S. initiative
are:
 Warning drivers of unsafe conditions or imminent collisions.
 Warning drivers if they are about to run off the road or speed around a curve too fast.
 Informing system operators of real-time congestion, weather conditions and incidents.
 Providing operators with information on corridor capacity for real-time management, planning and provision of corridor-wide advisories to drivers.
In mid-2007, a VII environment covering some  near Detroit will be used to test 20 prototype VII applications. Several automobile manufacturers are also conducting their own VII research and trialling.

See also

Intelligent transportation system
Tracking
Vehicle tracking system
GPS tracking
Automatic number plate recognition
Automated highway system
Driverless car

References

External links
VII Coalition Website 
ITS Website of the USDOT
FHWA Powerpoint Presentation
Michigan DOT VII Development Site
GPS World article on GPS-based VII 
eSafety

Road transport
Intelligent transportation systems
Automotive technologies
Automatic number plate recognition
Applications of computer vision
Applications of artificial intelligence